La Fría Airport , also known as Francisco García de Hevia International Airport, is an airport serving La Fría, a town in the Táchira state of Venezuela.

The La Fria VOR-DME (Ident: LFA) is located on the field.

Airlines and destinations

See also
Transport in Venezuela
List of airports in Venezuela

References

External links
SkyVector - La Fría
OurAirports - La Fría
OpenStreetMap - La Fría

Airports in Venezuela
Buildings and structures in Táchira